NBC Kids was an American Saturday morning children's television programming block that aired on NBC from July 7, 2012 to September 25, 2016. Telemundo also aired a version of the block under the "MiTelemundo" title, which featured a separate lineup of Spanish-dubbed programs until December 31, 2017. NBC Kids, which replaced the Qubo block (as a result of NBCUniversal dropping out of the joint venture, which also included Ion Media Networks), was programmed by the other Sprout preschool cable network, as they were both targeted at children ages 2 to 6.

The three-hour block featured educational entertainment series for younger children, which met programming requirements defined by the Federal Communications Commission's Children's Television Act. 

The block was replaced by Litton Entertainment's The More You Know, which features live-action educational programming on October 8, 2016 on NBC, and January 6, 2018 on Telemundo (retaining the MiTelemundo title).

History 
On March 28, 2012, NBC announced that the three-hour children's programming time period allocated by the network on Saturday mornings would be taken over by Sprout (which had become a sister television property to NBC following parent company NBCUniversal's 2010 majority purchase by Comcast; NBC later took full ownership of the network, whose owners previously included Sesame Workshop and HIT Entertainment) and launch a new Saturday morning block called NBC Kids, which was aimed at preschoolers and grade school-aged children ages 2 to 6. Sprout also produced a Spanish-language sister block for Telemundo known as MiTelemundo.

NBC Kids debuted on July 7, 2012, one week after the Qubo block ended its run on both NBC and Telemundo on June 30 (leaving Ion Television as the only network to retain a Qubo-branded children's block, as Ion Media Networks was now sole owner of the Qubo properties including the flagship Qubo Channel television service).

On October 8, 2016, NBC Kids was replaced by The More You Know, a live action educational block produced by Litton Entertainment. MiTelemundo continued with its prior format until January 6, 2018, when Telemundo relaunched MiTelemundo with Spanish-language dubs of The More You Know's programming.

Programming

Final programming

NBC

Original programming

Acquired programming

See also

 Universal Kids
 TeleXitos

References

Brokered programming
Children's television networks in the United States
Television programming blocks in the United States
National Broadcasting Company
Preschool education television networks